Sarabande Books is an American not-for-profit literary press founded in 1994. It is headquartered in Louisville, Kentucky, with an office in New York City. Sarabande publishes contemporary poetry and nonfiction. Sarabande is a literary press whose books have earned reviews in the New York Times.

The press was co-founded by Sarah Gorham (President and Editor-in-Chief) and Jeffrey Skinner (Chair). According to a CLMP Newswire interview, "The press was named after an Aztec mating dance that was later adopted and banned in Spain and finally made respectable in Britain. Its mission, according to Gorham, is to publish poetry and fiction and to disburse the works of its authors 'with diligence and creativity.' The press also serves as an educational resource to teachers and creative writing students." The press publishes the winners of its national poetry and fiction competitions, as well as manuscripts accepted through general submission.

Sarabande Books titles are distributed by Consortium Book Sales & Distribution. The press has received grants from the Kentucky Arts Council, the National Endowment for the Arts, and private foundations.

Notable authors published by Sarabande Books include Ralph Angel, Rick Barot, Frank Bidart, Sallie Bingham, Alice Fulton, Louise Glück, Mark Jarman, James Kimbrell, Karen An-hwei Lee, Cate Marvin, Cleopatra Mathis, Alyce Miller, Kyle Minor, Edith Pearlman, Kiki Petrosino, Lia Purpura, Joan Silber, Gerald Stern, Deborah Tall, and Ann Townsend.

Authors have been recipients of many awards including the Whiting Foundation Award, the PEN USA Award in Poetry, the Norma Farber First Book Award, the Pushcart Prize, grants from the National Endowment for the Arts, Guggenheim Fellowships, and numerous other honors.

Sarabande Books titles have been reviewed in The New York Times Book Review, Publishers Weekly, Library Journal, Kirkus Reviews, The Nation, American Book Review, and many other publications.

Awards given by Sarabande Books include the Kathryn A. Morton Prize in Poetry and the Mary McCarthy Prize in Short Fiction.

Awards
In 2013, Sarabande Books was the inaugural winner of the AWP Small Press Publisher Award given by the Association of Writers & Writing Programs that "acknowledges the hard work, creativity, and innovation" of small presses and "their contributions to the literary landscape" of the US.

References

External links
 Sarabande Books Website
 Mary McCarthy Prize
 Kathryn A. Morton Prize

Poetry publishers
Publishing companies established in 1994
Book publishing companies of the United States
Non-profit organizations based in Louisville, Kentucky
Literary publishing companies
1994 establishments in Kentucky